The Dyson School of Design Engineering is the academic centre for design engineering at Imperial College London. The school has just over 50 academic staff and 400 students, with over 220 undergraduates. The school is located in the Dyson building, at the corner of Exhibition and Imperial College roads.

History 
The school was founded in 2014 following a £12m donation by the James Dyson Foundation to the college, being the first new engineering division at Imperial for two decades. In 2018, the school moved into the newly-christened Dyson Building on Exhibition Road. The building was once the London headquarters of the Met Office, from 1910 to 1919, with some of the original interiors and signage preserved inside the entrance from Exhibition Road. Since then it has had various other uses, including as part of the Science Museum, which adjoins the building to the south, and as a post office. The renovation of the building was undertaken by Pascall+Watson, and cost £14 million.

Academics

Study 

The school offers a four-year integrated undergraduate Master of Engineering course, which started in 2015. It also offers a joint two-year postgraduate course with the Royal College of Art, which awards a master's degree in each of art and science from the respective institutions. As part of the Faculty of Engineering, undergraduates from the school are also awarded Associate of the City and Guilds of London Institute alongside their degree, and postgraduates are awarded the Diploma of Imperial College.

People

Heads of School 

 2018–present, Peter Cheung (also professor at the Department of Electrical and Electronic Engineering)

References 

Educational institutions established in 2014
Design Engineering
2014 establishments in England
Dyson School of Design Engineering